Howard Wood Hayes (October 30, 1877 in Steubenville, Ohio – August 30, 1937 in Chicago, Illinois) was an American track and field athlete who competed at the 1900 Summer Olympics in Paris, France.  He also competed in intercollegiate track for the University of Michigan. A judge on the Municipal Court of Chicago, Hayes committed suicide by shooting himself in 1937.

In 1923, Hayes was an unsuccessful Republican nominee for a seat on the Superior Court of Cook County. He finished twenty-first place in the election, with and only the first twenty finishers were elected to the court.

Hayes competed in the 800 metres.  He placed third in his first-round (semifinals) heat and did not advance to the final.

References

External links 

 De Wael, Herman. Herman's Full Olympians: "Athletics 1900". Accessed 18 March 2006.
 

1877 births
1937 suicides
Athletes (track and field) at the 1900 Summer Olympics
Olympic track and field athletes of the United States
American male middle-distance runners
Michigan Wolverines men's track and field athletes
20th-century American judges
Suicides by firearm in Illinois
Lawyers from Chicago
Municipal judges in the United States
Sportspeople from Steubenville, Ohio
Illinois Republicans